Albert Sala Moreno (born 15 July 1981) is a field hockey player from Spain, who finished in fourth position with the Men's National Team at the 2004 Summer Olympics in Athens, Greece.

After having played for Atlètic Terrassa for several years, he moved to The Netherlands in the summer of 2006, and started to play for Stichtse Cricket en Hockey Club in Bilthoven.

Albert Sala Moreno graduated from the Johan Cruyff Institute in the International Master of Sport Management.

References
 Spanish Olympic Committee

External links
 

1981 births
Living people
Sportspeople from Terrassa
Field hockey players from Catalonia
Spanish male field hockey players
Olympic field hockey players of Spain
2002 Men's Hockey World Cup players
Field hockey players at the 2004 Summer Olympics
2006 Men's Hockey World Cup players
Field hockey players at the 2008 Summer Olympics
2010 Men's Hockey World Cup players
Olympic silver medalists for Spain
Olympic medalists in field hockey
Medalists at the 2008 Summer Olympics
SCHC players
Spanish expatriate sportspeople in the Netherlands
Expatriate field hockey players
Atlètic Terrassa players